Testimony is an album by the Gap Band, released in 1994. The album pulled several songs from Charlie Wilson's solo album You Turn My Life Around (1992). None of the songs charted.

Track listing

References

External links
 Testimony at Discogs

1994 albums
The Gap Band albums